Kim Yuna's Kiss & Cry was a South Korean figure skating/ice dancing competition/reality show. It aired from May 22 to August 21, 2011 as part of the Good Sunday line-up on SBS. While the professional skater can perform jumps within a program, the lifting restrictions (no lifts above the man's waist) meant this is mostly in line with ice dancing regulations.

Cast

Hosts 
 Yuna Kim
 Shin Dong-yup

Judges 
 Yuna Kim
 Go Sunghee
 David Wilson
 Kim Jang-hoon
 Park Haebi

Skaters

References

External links
  
  
  

2011 South Korean television series debuts
2011 South Korean television series endings
Seoul Broadcasting System original programming
Figure skating on television
South Korean variety television shows